The 1968–69 Yugoslav First Basketball League season was the 25th season of the Yugoslav First Basketball League, the highest professional basketball league in SFR Yugoslavia.

Classification 

The winning roster of Crvena Zvezda:
  Miroslav Todosijević
  Ivan Sarjanović
  Miroslav Poljak
  Vladimir Cvetković
  Aleksandar Stanimirović
  Dragan Kapičić
  Ljubodrag Simonović
  Dragiša Vučinić
  Srđan Škulić
  Tihomir Pavlović
  Zoran Slavnić
  Zoran Lazarević
  Dubravko Kapetanović
  Slobodan Popović
  Dragoslav Ilić

Coach:  Milan Bjegojević

Qualification in 1969-70 season European competitions 

FIBA European Champions Cup
 Crvena Zvezda (champions)

FIBA Cup Winner's Cup
 Lokomotiva (Cup winners)

References

Yugoslav First Basketball League seasons
Yugo
Yugo